NOAA-5, also known as ITOS-H was a weather satellite operated by the National Oceanic and Atmospheric Administration (NOAA). It was part of a series of satellites called ITOS, or improved TIROS, being the last of the series. NOAA-5 was launched on a Delta rocket on July 29, 1976.

Mission
NOAA-5 was one in a series of improved TIROS-M type satellites launched with new meteorological sensors on board to expand the operational capacity of the ITOS (NOAA) system. The primary objectives of the NOAA-5 meteorological satellite were to provide global daytime and nighttime direct readout cloud cover data on a daily basis. The sun-synchronous spacecraft was capable of supplying global atmospheric temperature soundings and very high resolution infrared cloudcover data of selected areas in either a direct readout or a tape recorder mode. A secondary objective was to obtain global solar proton density data on a routine daily basis. The primary sensors consisted of a very high resolution radiometer (VHRR), a vertical temperature profile radiometer (VTPR), and a scanning radiometer (SR). The VHRR, VTPR, and SR were mounted on the satellite baseplate with their optical axes directed vertically earthward. The nearly cubical spacecraft measured . The satellite was equipped with three curved solar panels that were folded during launch and deployed after orbit was achieved.

The ITOS dynamics and attitude control system maintained desired spacecraft orientation through gyroscopic principles incorporated into the satellite design. Earth orientation of the satellite body was maintained by taking advantage of the precession induced from a momentum flywheel so that the satellite body precession rate of one revolution per orbit provided the desired "earth looking" attitude. Minor adjustments in attitude and orientation were made by means of magnetic coils and by varying the speed of the momentum flywheel. The satellite was placed in a sun-synchronous orbit with equatorial crossing of the ascending node near 08:30 A.M. local time.

See also
 Nimbus program

References

External links
 NOAA-5 Satellite Position

1976 in spaceflight
Weather satellites of the United States
Spacecraft launched in 1976
Spacecraft launched by Delta rockets